Neotermes jouteli is a species of neotropical dampwood termite in the family Kalotermitidae       which is native to South Florida and surrounding West Indian nations. N. jouteli is the largest species of termite in Florida with soldiers reaching a maximum length of 13.35 mm and the winged alates around 16.05 mm.

Identification 

The frons (area of head directly above the clypeus) of the imago is deeply depressed with a rugose texture.

References 

Termites